Sestra humeraria, also known as huarau looper, is a species of moth in the family Geometridae. It was described by Francis Walker in 1861. This species is endemic to New Zealand.

Description
The mature larva of this species has a slightly knobbly appearance with a pale brown body marked with darker wavy lines. It is between 25 and 30 mm in length.

Behaviour
When the larvae are touched they drop down to the soil or leaf litter. The larvae can be seen all year but the adult moths are on the wing from October to December.

Host
The larval host of this species is the fern Hypolepis millefolium. The larvae feed on the fronds of their host.

References

Moths of New Zealand
Moths described in 1861
Taxa named by Francis Walker (entomologist)
Endemic fauna of New Zealand
Ennominae
Endemic moths of New Zealand